Crowninshield may refer to the following:

 Crowninshield family, long-standing American family
 USS Crowninshield, a World War I era American destroyer
 Crowninshield Island, a small island off the coast of Salem, Massachusetts